9K may refer to:
 9000 (number), the natural number following 8999 and preceding 9001
 Gnome-Rhône 9K, a 9-cylinder 550 hp (405 kW) air-cooled radial engine
 Cape Air IATA airline designator
 Kuwait aircraft registration code
 Kampfgeschwader 51, from its historic Geschwaderkennung code with the Luftwaffe in World War II
NY 9K, see New York State Route 9N
Soyuz 9K, see Soyuz-B
Yak 9K, see Yakovlev Yak-9
9K, a model of SNECMA Atar
Typ 9K, a model of SEAT Inca
GCR Class 9K, a class of British 4-4-2T steam locomotive

See also
K9 (disambiguation)